Oregon Waste Systems, Inc. v. Department of Environmental Quality of Oregon, 511 U.S. 93 (1994), is a United States Supreme Court decision focused on the aspect of state power and the interpretation of the Commerce Clause as a limitation on states' regulatory power. In this particular case, the Supreme Court considered whether the Oregon Department of Environmental Quality's alleged cost-based surcharge on the disposal of out-of-state waste violated the dormant commerce clause.

Opinion of the Court 
The Court voted 7–2 in favor of Oregon Waste Systems, holding that Oregon's surcharge was invalid under the negative commerce clause. This meant that the surcharge favored in-state economic interests over out-of-state counterparts. The surcharge was discriminatory to outside states because it imposed a fee three times greater than that imposed on in-state waste.

In order for such a surcharge to be valid, it would have to be justified as compensatory, in that it makes out-of-state shippers pay their fair share of the disposal costs. This would have to be equivalent to a measurable standard that would be the same for in-state shipping. However, Oregon's surcharge of $2.25 for out-of-state waste compared with a surcharge of $0.85 on in-state waste was determined facially discriminatory. Citing a previous case, the Supreme Court indicated that such surcharges may be acceptable if they were based on increased costs specifically associated with out-of-state waste.

See also
 City of Philadelphia v. New Jersey, 437 U.S. 617 (1978)
 List of United States Supreme Court cases
 Lists of United States Supreme Court cases by volume
 List of United States Supreme Court cases, volume 511
 List of United States Supreme Court cases by the Rehnquist Court

References

External links

United States Constitution Article One case law
United States Supreme Court cases
United States Supreme Court cases of the Rehnquist Court
United States Dormant Commerce Clause case law
Legal history of Oregon
Environment of Oregon
1994 in the environment
1994 in United States case law
Waste management in the United States